Artistes 512 Fund Raising Campaign was a major fundraising concert held in Hong Kong for the victims of the 2008 Sichuan earthquake. The concert was held on June 1, 2008, and began at 2:28pm, the time the earthquake had struck Sichuan on May 12. The show was 7 to 8-hours long, featuring more than 200 stars from Hong Kong, Taiwan and mainland China. The theme song is lyrics rewriting of 海闊天空 sung by Beyond (band).

Preparation
On May 22, 2008, members of the fund raising campaign got together. They were led by Andy Lau, and waited in a moment of silence. Donations were accepted from June 1 to June 7. A number of major banks have been involved with the donations including Bank of China (Hong Kong), Bank of Communications and The Hongkong and Shanghai Banking Corporation.

Broadcast and locale
The event took place at Pop TV Arena (西九龍中天地) at West Kowloon. The show is broadcast on Hong Kong's TVB, ATV and CableTV. Some channels such as Phoenix TV also broadcast it in parts.

Participants
The following is a list of participants at the concert. The collection of celebrities include singers, actors, actresses, directors, producers and a wide variety of performers.

See also
 Artistes 88 Fund Raising Campaign
 Artistes 414 Fund Raising Campaign

References

https://www.youtube.com/user/earthquakespecial/videos

External links
 Official website
 Official website listing of stars (may not be final)

Music festivals in Hong Kong
2008 Sichuan earthquake
Benefit concerts
2008 in Hong Kong
Concerts